Vitaly Denisov (born February 27, 1976) is a Russian cross-country skier who competed from 1997 to 2003. He won a bronze medal in the 10 km + 10 km combined pursuit at the 2001 FIS Nordic World Ski Championships in Lahti.

Denisov's best individual finish at the Winter Olympics was 5th in the 10 km + 10 km combined pursuit at Salt Lake City in 2002. He won two individual races in his career (1999, 2002).

Cross-country skiing results
All results are sourced from the International Ski Federation (FIS).

Olympic Games

World Championships
 1 medal – (1 bronze)

World Cup

Season standings

Individual podiums

1 podium

Team podiums
 1 victory – (1 )
 8 podiums – (8 )

References

External links

1976 births
Living people
Russian male cross-country skiers
Olympic cross-country skiers of Russia
Cross-country skiers at the 2002 Winter Olympics
FIS Nordic World Ski Championships medalists in cross-country skiing
Sportspeople from Barnaul